Wutöschingen is one of the 25 municipalities in the Waldshut district (Kreis) of Baden-Württemberg, Germany.

References

Waldshut (district)
Baden